Oxiperomide is an antipsychotic. Clinical trials demonstrated that it can reduce dyskinesia in patients with Parkinson's disease who are taking dopamine agonists without increasing Parkinsonian symptoms. It does this by selectively antagonizing dopamine receptors. Further development of this drug is not available. It appears to have never been marketed.

See also
Benperidol
Neflumozide

References 

Antipsychotics
Benzimidazoles
Piperidines